St Peter's Catholic School is a co-educational Roman Catholic school located in Bournemouth, Dorset, England. It is run under the joint trusteeship of the Roman Catholic Diocese of Portsmouth and a religious order of teachers, the De La Salle Brothers. Former headteacher David Todd joined the school in 2013 and converted the school into an academy. The current headteacher is Mr Doyle.

St Peter's has achieved both drama and sports specialist school status. The nearest Catholic church is Our Lady Queen of Peace and Blessed Margaret Pole.

The Lower Primary School (Years reception –6) is on Holdenhurst Avenue, Iford; the Upper School (Years 7–13) is on St. Catherine's Road, Southbourne. The Upper School site includes the De La Salle Theatre, which seats 470 people.

History

Jesuits
St Peter's was opened as a boys' boarding school on 29 September 1936 with 34 boys. Father Bellanti was the first headmaster and the school was run by Jesuit priests. The bedrooms were later removed, and the swimming pool was demolished due to building problems, and the area given over to serving as the school's Sixth Form Centre after a refurbishment.

De La Salle Brothers
In the summer of 1947, the school was handed over to the De La Salle brothers. The last Jesuit community consisted of nine fathers and two brothers. One of the Jesuit priests who was a housemaster at St Peter's was Father Gerard Hughes S.J., the author of  God of Surprise in which he observed St Peter's boys were "affable and undemanding". At the time of transition there were 145 boys in the school.

Independent Grammar School
From the time of the first De La Salle headmaster, Brother Bernard Brady in 1947, until 1980, under Brother Bernard Hayward, St. Peters was a fee-paying independent grammar school that, together with Boscombe Convent School, served the Bournemouth area, particularly the Catholic community. During this time, the De La Salle brothers improved, enlarged and ran the school; thirty years later numbers had increased to nearly 800 pupils across the school from 8–18 years of age.
In 1973 it sent nearly 14% of its graduating Sixth Form students to Oxford and Cambridge. Under the headmastership of Brother Alan Maurice, the school became a member of the Headmasters' and Headmistresses' Conference (HMC) association of public schools. Boaters were allowed to be worn by Sixth Form students, and boarders wore grey suits instead of the normal weekday blue on Sundays when going to Mass and Benediction. One pupil, Robert Pidgeon, was recorded in the Guinness Book of Records for passing 13 O levels at grade A in one sitting in 1975; later passing three A levels at grade A and two S levels.

From 1970 girls wishing to follow a mainly science-based course of study were admitted to A Level, beginning the trend towards co-educational teaching in the school.

After the reorganisation of local education and the changes made by the Labour government in 1974, St Peter's, St Thomas More and Boscombe Convent schools were combined and integrated, with a notice of intent published on 13 October 1978, followed in 1980 by the merging of Boscombe Convent and St Thomas More, and all schools combined on the one site with the name of St Peter's by 1986.

Comprehensive
In 1992, the Brothers withdrew from the day-to-day running of the school, though remaining trustees, and the first headmaster who was not a member of a religious order, Anthony McCaffrey, was appointed. He retired at the end of the 2011 academic year after 19 years of leadership of St Peter's.

Arts and Sports College status
St. Peter's School gained Arts College status in September 2000, and in September 2004 gained dual specialist status in Arts and Sport.

As an Arts College St Peter's was shortlisted, but not selected, for the 2008 Sky1 TV programme Hairspray: The School Musical, with students being interviewed and auditioned.

In 2008 St Peter's School made it to the National Theatre Connections final round, with Sixth Form student Oliver Biles directing the company.

Academy status
The school was granted Academy status at the beginning of September 2011. Martyn Egan led the school throughout its first year as an academy. David Todd became headteacher in September 2012 and resigned in August 2019, replaced in an acting capacity by Ben Doyle.

From 1 September 2014 St Peter's became an "all-through" school, with the establishment of two Reception classes at the Iford site. In September 2016, Years 7 and 8 joined the main site at Southbourne, leaving the Iford site for the sole use of the primary school.

Headteachers
 1974—1976: Brother Charles 
 1977—1979: Brother Bernard Hayward
 1980—1980: Brother Ralph Sherwin
 1980—1992: Brother Bernard Hayward
 1992—2011: Mr Anthony McCaffery
 2011—2012: Mr Martyn Egan
 2012—2019: Mr David Todd
 2019–Current: Mr Ben Doyle

Commemoration 

A circular memorial to mark the motoring and aviation pioneer Charles Rolls, is situated in the bottom corner of the playing field at the Southbourne site of St Peter's School. The school was built adjacent to Hengistbury Airfield where Rolls had a fatal accident in July 1910. A large air show was taking place as part of Bournemouth's centenary celebrations; Rolls' aeroplane crashed, the first air accident death in England.

In 2010, St Peter's marked the centenary of the death of Charles Rolls by having a fair on the Headmaster's Lawn at the Southbourne site. The memorial was also refurbished. The Central Band of the RAF performed in the school hall and there was an exhibition of Rolls-Royce aviation memorabilia, including an aero-engine.

Notable former pupils 

 Jack Donnelly, actor
 Sir Andrew Pollard, COVID-19 vaccinologist and virologist
 Oliver Biles
 Leilani Dowding, model
 Waldemar Januszczak, art critic and journalist
 Adam Lallana, professional footballer for England and Brighton and Hove Albion F.C.
 Andy Long, England rugby international
 Henry McGee, actor
 Geva Mentor, England netball international
 Lance Secretan, author
 Lucy Pinder, model
 Chris Butcher, England rugby international
 Chris Crilly, composer, conductor
 Rocco Forte, hotelier
 Andrew John Scott, botanist

School productions (2010–present) 
All Musicals performed in the school's own theatre, The De LA Salle Theatre

 2023, We Will Rock You Dir. M Fox 
 2022, Footloose Dir. M Fox 
2020, Sweeney Todd: The Demon Barber of Fleet Street. Dir. M Fox
 2019, West Side Story Dir. M Fox
 2018, Les Misérables, Dir. M Fox
 2017, Our House: The Madness Musical, Dir. M Fox
 2016, Joseph and His Amazing Technicolored Dreamcoat, Dir. C Hawker
 2014, Footloose, Dir. M Fox
 2013, Miss Saigon, Dir. M Fox
 2012, Little Shop of Horrors, Dir. C Hawker
 2011, Hairspray, Dir. M Fox
 2010, Cabaret, Dir. M Fox & S Pyburn

References

External links

Schools in Bournemouth
Educational institutions established in 1936
Portsmouth
Catholic secondary schools in the Diocese of Portsmouth
Theatres in Dorset
1936 establishments in England
Secondary schools in Bournemouth, Christchurch and Poole
Academies in Bournemouth, Christchurch and Poole
Primary schools in Bournemouth, Christchurch and Poole